Natalia Kołat (born 19 November 1987) is a retired Polish tennis player.

Kołat won three singles and 19 doubles titles on the ITF Circuit during her career. On 7 April 2008, she reached her best singles ranking of world No. 281. On 3 August 2009, she peaked at No. 135 in the doubles rankings.

Kołat made her WTA Tour main-draw debut at the 2007 Internationaux de Strasbourg, in the doubles event partnering Émilie Bacquet.

She retired from tennis 2013.

ITF finals

Singles (3–2)

Doubles (19–11)

References

External links
 
 

1987 births
Living people
Polish female tennis players
Place of birth missing (living people)
20th-century Polish women
21st-century Polish women